Dangerous Lies is a 1921 British silent drama film directed by Paul Powell. Alfred Hitchcock is credited as a title designer. The film is now lost.

Plot
As described in a film magazine, Joan (Glynne), a poor rector's daughter, marries a bounder and, after she discovers his true character, leaves him to make her way in London. She meets and falls in love with Sir Henry Bond (Powell), a wealthy collector of antique books, and marries him after reading of her husband's sudden death. Later it is discovered that her husband was not dead, and that he had the notice printed to throw creditors off his trail. Joan goes to his hotel room and a struggle ensues in which her husband falls dead from a heart attack, leaving her free for happiness with her book connoisseur.

Cast
 David Powell as Sir Henry Bond
 Mary Glynne as Joan Farrant
 Arthur M. Cullin as Eli Hodges
 Ernest A. Douglas as Reverend Farrant
 Warburton Gamble as Leonard Pearce
 Clifford Grey as Franklin Bond
 Minna Grey as Olive Farrant
 Harry Ham as Phelps Westcott
 Philip Hewland as Doctor
 Daisy Sloane as Nanette

See also
 Alfred Hitchcock filmography

References

External links

1921 films
1921 drama films
1921 lost films
Lost British films
British drama films
British silent feature films
British black-and-white films
Films directed by Paul Powell (director)
Lost drama films
1920s British films
Silent drama films
1920s English-language films